Joseph VIII Peter Hobaish (April 23, 1787 in Sahel Aalma, Lebanon –  May 23, 1845 in Dimane, Lebanon), (or Youssef Hobaish, Yusuf Hubaysh, Hubais, Hobeish, Hobaich), was a bishop of the Maronite Catholic Archeparchy of Tripoli and 68th Maronite Patriarch of Antioch from 1823 until his death in 1845.

Life

Joseph Peter Hobaish was born in the village of Sahel Aalma, near Jounieh, in the Keserwan District, Lebanon on April 23, 1787. He studied at the seminary of 'Ain Warqa and was ordained priest on June 26, 1814, and later he was consecrated bishop of Tripoli on January 30, 1820 by Patriarch John Helou.

Patriarch John Helou died on May 12, 1823, and Joseph Peter Hobaish was elected Patriarch on May 25, 1823 by the patriarchal synod in the monastery of Santa Maria  of Qannubin. On May 29, 1823 took place his ceremony of enthronement. Pope Leo XII confirmed his election on May 3, 1824 even if there were some canonical irregularities in the election detected by the Propaganda Fide: actually Hobaish didn't reach the two-thirds majority of votes, nor he was already forty.

As Patriarch, Joseph Hobaish urged improving the formation of priests. The Maronite College in Rome no longer existed after 1808, but his attempts to reorganize it were unsuccessful. However popes Pius VIII and Gregory XVI were willing to accommodate students in the Maronite Pontifical Urban College. Hobaish thus reorganized the seminary 'Ain-Warka and opened two new seminaries, Mar 'Abda Harharaia in 1830 and Mar Sarsik et Bakhos in 1832. In 1840 he founded a religious congregation of missionaries. He introduced a modified liturgical ritual book which included many latinizations, and he took measures to limit the increasing Protestant missionary activity. Joseph Hobaish further definitively implemented two of the more controversial decrees of the Maronite Synod of 1736: the separation of monasteries where both men and women lived, and the definition of a fixed episcopal residence into each Maronite diocese.

Joseph Hobaish moved the Patriarchal residence from the Qannubin Monastery, located in the deep gorge of Kadisha Valley where his predecessors had resided almost continuously since 1440, and established two separate Patriarchal residences: the summer one at Bkerké near Jounieh and the winter one in the more accessible village of Dimane which overlooks the Kadisha Valley. Finally Hobaish put into effect one of the most controversial decisions of the synod of 1736 (confirmed by the Synod of 1818): the final separation between the monasteries and religious.

The years of his patriarchate were turbulent years for Lebanon, which suffered the invasion and occupation of Egypt from 1831 to 1840, and therefore became the arena of international conflicts that involved France, Britain, the Ottoman Empire, Austria, Prussia and other countries. The introduction of the double-Qaim maqamat, namely the division of Lebanon into two districts, one Druze and a Maronite, only served to exacerbate relations between the two sides, particularly in the years 1841–1845. Youssef Hobaish intervened several times to restore peace between the two souls of Lebanon, and his efforts earned him a special praise by Pope Gregory XVI.

Joseph Hobaish had a deep pastoral attitude, often visiting the parish churches of his country, instructing the priests, settling local quarrels and founding schools. He was highly estimated not only by his flock, but also by the Ottoman rulers.

While it was possible, Joseph Hobaish acted as an impartial arbiter between Druzes and Christians, but when Great Britain armed the Druzes against the Maronite peasants, he took a fierce position in unifying all the Christian population of Lebanon. The last years of Joseph Hobaish were saddened by the bloody events of the 1840-1845 attacks on the Christian population. Joseph Peter Hobaish died on May 23, 1845 at Dimane and was buried in the Qannubin Monastery.

See also

 List of Maronite Patriarchs
 Maronite Church

Sources

 Pierre Dib, v. Maronite (Eglise), https://archive.org/stream/dictionnairedet10pt1vaca#page/n59/mode/2up, Tome Dixième, première partie, Paris 1928, coll. 103–105.
 K. Rizk, Hobaish Joseph, in Dictionnaire d'histoire et de géographie ecclésiastiques, 24 (1993), pp. 698–699.

Notes

External links
 http://www.catholic-hierarchy.org/bishop/bhabai.html
 http://www.kobayat.org/data/maronites/patriarchs.htm#y-hobeich
 http://www.gcatholic.org/dioceses/diocese/anti0.htm

18th-century people from the Ottoman Empire
19th-century people from the Ottoman Empire
1787 births
1845 deaths
Lebanese religious leaders
Lebanese Maronites
Maronite Patriarchs of Antioch